Alessandro Specchi (1668 – 16 November 1729) was an Italian architect and engraver.

Biography 
Born in 1668 in Rome, he trained as an architect under Carlo Fontana. He also specialized as an engraver and made a well known series of plates for prints of vedute or views of Rome.

As an architect, he was influenced by Francesco Borromini. His first major constructed work was the design of the Baroque Porto di Ripetta, the port of Rome, on the banks of the River Tevere or Tiber. With the design of this port Specchi broke with the classicizing architecture of his teacher Fontana. The port was destroyed in 1874 with the development of flood defences and the river bank road of Lungotevere, and replaced by Rome's Ponte Cavour, and his fountain at the top of the port was moved to a nearby site.

In 1711 he became a member of the Academy of St. Luke, the artists' academy in Rome.

As the papal architect, he submitted a design for the famous Spanish Steps leading up from the Piazza di Spagna to the French church of the Trinità dei Monti, but the proposal by the little-known Italian architect Francesco de Sanctis was preferred by the French monks and the Steps were constructed to his design between 1723 and 1728.

He designed and was involved with alterations to various Roman palaces: he designed the Palazzo de Carolis on the Via del Corso (now the headquarters of the Banco di Roma),the high altar in the Pantheon, the Palazzo Pichini; and made alterations to the Palazzo Verospi and the Palazzo Albani, and additions to the Palazzo del Quirinale. His design for the church of the Bambino Gesu was not carried out due to lack of finance and he added the upper facade to Vignola's church of Saint Anne in Vatican.

Notes

References

1668 births
1729 deaths
18th-century Italian architects
Architects from Rome
Italian etchers